Bishtiryak (Biştiräk) is a rural locality (a village) in Baishevsky Selsoviet, Zianchurinsky District, Bashkortostan, Russia. The population was 197 as of 2010. There are 2 streets.

Geography 
Bishtiryak is located 107 km southeast of Isyangulovo (the district's administrative centre) by road. Ilmalya is the nearest rural locality.

References 

Rural localities in Zianchurinsky District